Alec Brader  (born 6 October 1942) is an English professional footballer, schoolteacher and youth athletics coach who played as an inside forward. Following his football career he became a schoolteacher teaching Physical Education, Geography, and European Studies, spending most of his career at William Lovell Academy where he eventually became Deputy Headmaster. He also volunteered as a youth athletics coach for Lincolnshire teams for over 40 years. For the Easter time he organized and went on tour with the Lincs Schools F.A. to the triborder area of the Netherlands, Germany, and Belgium. The youth soccer players took part in international soccer tournaments and friendly matches.  

For his services to "young people" he was made a Member of the Order of the British Empire in 2009 New Years Honours list.

References 

1942 births
People from Horncastle, Lincolnshire
People from Sibsey
English footballers
Association football inside forwards
Grimsby Town F.C. players
Skegness Town A.F.C. players
English Football League players
Members of the Order of the British Empire
Living people